Bradley McConnell Glass (January 17, 1931 – August 6, 2015) was an American politician in the state of Illinois. He served in the Illinois Senate from 1973 to 1979.

Early life
Bradley McConnell Glass was born on January 17, 1931, in Evanston, Illinois.
Glass was a member of the 1950 College Football All-America Team while at Princeton. He was also on the Princeton wrestling team, winning an NCAA heavyweight title in 1951. He is a member of the Eastern Intercollegiate Wrestling Association Hall of Fame. A lawyer, he was an alumnus of Princeton University in 1953 and University of Michigan Law School. After graduating from Princeton, Glass enlisted in the United States Navy and graduated from Officer Candidate School. Glass retired with the rank of Lieutenant. He also served on village and school boards. Bradley served as village attorney for Palatine, Illinois and Northfield, Illinois. During this time, Glass was involved with the Regular Republican Organization in Northfield Township as a precinct captain, area director, and executive board member.

Political career
In 1968, Glass was an unsuccessful candidate for the Cook County Circuit Court. In 1970, Glass was elected to the Illinois House of Representatives. After W. Russell Arrington announced his retirement, Glass announced his intention to succeed Arrington. In the 1972 general election, Glass defeated Democratic candidate and political science professor Ann Matasar to succeed Arrington in the 1st district. In the 1978 Republican primary, Glass ran for the Republican nomination for Illinois Treasurer. James M. Skelton, the county treasurer for Champaign County, defeated Glass in the primary with 52% of the vote. Glass was succeeded by fellow Republican Roger A. Keats in the Illinois Senate.

Post-political career
In 1987, Glass and his wife moved to Dodgeville, Wisconsin where he practiced law and was the Dodgeville village attorney. While a Wisconsin resident, Glass served as a member of the Lower Wisconsin State Riverway Board and the Southwestern Wisconsin Regional Planning Commission. He died in Dodgeville, Wisconsin on August 6, 2015, after a long struggle with Alzheimer's disease.

References

1931 births
2015 deaths
People from Evanston, Illinois
People from Dodgeville, Wisconsin
Princeton University alumni
University of Michigan Law School alumni
Wisconsin lawyers
Illinois lawyers
School board members in Illinois
Illinois city council members
Republican Party Illinois state senators
Republican Party members of the Illinois House of Representatives
People from Northfield, Illinois
Military personnel from Illinois
20th-century American lawyers